José Pablo Minor (born 23 March 1991 in Cancún, Quintana Roo, Mexico),  is a Mexican actor, television host, and model.

Early life 
Minor was born in Cancún, Quintana Roo, Mexico. He has one brother named Luis Rodrigo.

Modeling career
He began modeling in Cancún when he was 13 years old. In 2014, he earned second place in El Modelo México, the male model version of the beauty pageant, Nuestra Belleza México. Because the original winner unable to compete due to an injury sustained in an accident, Minor represented Mexico at the 2014 Mister World contest in Torbay, England from May 30 to June 15, 2014. He took classes to improve his English in preparation for the contest. He finished the competition in third place.

Acting career
As an infant, he had a small role as an extra in an episode of the Mexican telenovela, Muchachitas. In 2010, Minor gained acceptance to Centro de Educación Artística, Televisa's free acting school, where he studied acting and graduated in 2012.  During his studies at CEA he acted in various school plays and appeared in several projects by produced Televisa including Miss XV and Mentir para Vivir. In October 2013, he was announced as a cast member in the successful comedy telenovela, Qué pobres tan ricos. The telenovela was produced by Rosy Ocampo and aired on Canal de las Estrellas in Mexico from November 13, 2013, to June 29, 2014. His participation in producer Pedro Damián's remake, Muchacha italiana viene a casarse was confirmed in August 2014. He played "Gael Ángeles". Filming began in early September at Televisa San Ángel in Mexico City. The telenovela premiered on Canal de las Estrellas on October 20, 2014.

In July 2014, he began co-hosting Zona Trendy Mexico, a young adult-targeted series, which is produced by and aired weeknights  on E! Latin America. The series is filmed at various Mexico City locations and premiered in Mexico on July 23, 2014.

In 2015, Minor was cast in the telenovela drama, Pasión y poder, a remake of the 1988 Mexican telenovela of the same name. The telenovela premiered on Canal de las Estrellas on October 5, 2015. On April 17, 2016, Minor won "Mejor Actor Co-estelar" at the 2016 Premios TVyNovelas awards show.

Following Pasión y poder, Minor was cast in the Mexican romantic comedy movie Plan virgen. The movie was expected to begin filming in July 2016 but production was delayed for several months.  Filming finally began in mid-December 2016 and is expected to last until late January 2017. The film is now called Plan V.  Filming was  conducted in Guadalajara and Mexico City. The movie is expected to be released in February 2018. Minor obtained a role in the mini series, "Sin rastro de ti", which began production in early July 2016 in Mexico City.  The series consists of 16 episodes  and began airing on 1 August 2016 in Mexico.

Personal life 
Minor holds a commercial pilot's license. He was in a relationship with actress Natasha Dupeyrón, whom he met through friends when he was a student at the Centro de Educación Artística, from 2012 until late 2015. Minor confirmed his breakup from Dupeyron in February 2016. He currently lives in Mexico City. In mid-August 2016, he travelled to Chiang Mai, Thailand where he volunteered at an elephant sanctuary. Later, he lived in Nepal and taught English classes to schoolchildren. His volunteer trip ended in October 2016 and he returned to Mexico City.

Filmography

Television

Awards and nominations

References

External links 

Jeremy ML Talent Agency Profile
José Pablo Minor Official Instagram

Mexican male models
Mexican male telenovela actors
Mexican male television actors
21st-century Mexican male actors
Male actors from Quintana Roo
People from Cancún
1991 births
Living people